Bagh-e Nuri may refer to:
Bagh-e Nuri, Kerman
Bagh-e Nuri, Lorestan